Cumming is a city in Forsyth County, Georgia, United States, and the sole incorporated area in the county. It is a suburban city, and part of the Atlanta metropolitan area. In the 2020 census, the population is 7,318, up from 5,430 in 2010. Surrounding unincorporated areas with a Cumming mailing address have a population of approximately 100,000. Cumming is the county seat of Forsyth County.

History

The area now called Cumming is located west of the historic location of Vann's Ferry between Forsyth County and Hall County.

Early history

The area, now called Cumming, was inhabited earlier by Cherokee tribes, who are thought to have arrived in the mid-18th century. The Cherokee and Creek people developed disputes over hunting land. After two years of fighting, the Cherokee won the land in the Battle of Taliwa. The Creek people were forced to move south of the Chattahoochee River.

The Cherokee coexisted with white settlers until the discovery of gold in Georgia in 1828. Settlers that moved to the area to mine for gold pushed for the removal of the Cherokee. In 1835, the Treaty of New Echota was signed. The treaty stated that the Cherokee Nation must move to the Indian Territory, west of the Mississippi River. This resulted in the Trail of Tears. The Cherokee territory was then formed into Cherokee County in 1831. In 1832, the county had been split into several counties including Forsyth County.

In 1833, the town of Cumming was formed from two  land lots that had been issued as part of a Georgia State Land Lottery in 1832. The two lots designated as Land Lot 1269 and Land Lot 1270 were purchased by a couple of Forsyth County Inferior Court justices who realized that it was necessary to have a seat of government to conduct county business. The boundaries of the two lots ended at what is now Tolbert Street on the west side, Eastern Circle on the east side, Resthaven Street on the south side, and School Street on the north side. In 1834 the post office was established and began delivering mail. The justices of the Inferior Court divided the town land into smaller lots and began selling them to people over the next several years, reserving one lot for the county courthouse. During that same year, the Georgia State Legislature incorporated the town of Cumming into the City of Cumming and made it the official government seat of Forsyth County.

A second charter was issued in 1845, decreeing that Cumming's government would follow the mayor–council model of government.

The community is commonly thought to be named after Colonel William Cumming. An alternate theory proposed by a local historian posits the name honors Rev. Frederick Cumming, a professor of Jacob Scudder, a resident of the area since 1815 who owned land in present-day downtown. Yet another theory is that the town is named after Alexander Cuming, the son of a Scottish baronet.

Modern history
During the 1830s and 1840s, Cumming benefited from the gold mining industry as many businesses were created to meet the needs of the miners. However, the California Gold Rush in 1849 put the city into an economic depression. Newly built railroads bypassed the city and took traffic from the Federal Road that ran near Cumming. The city was spared during the Civil War because William T. Sherman did not pass through the city during his March to the Sea. In 1900, the county courthouse was destroyed in a fire after being struck by lightning; it was rebuilt in 1905.

1912 racial conflict

In 1912, Governor Joseph M. Brown sent four companies of state militia to Cumming to prevent riots after two reported attacks of young white women, allegedly by black men. A suspect in the second assault, in which the victim was also raped and later died, was dragged from the Cumming county jail and lynched. The governor then declared martial law, but the effort did little to stop a month-long barrage of attacks by night riders on the black citizens. This led to the banishment of blacks, and the city had virtually no black population.

Racial tensions were strained again in 1987 when a group of black people were assaulted while camping at a park on Lake Lanier. This was widely reported by local newspapers and in Atlanta. As a result of this a local businessman decided to hold a "Peace March" the following week. Civil rights leader Reverend Hosea Williams joined the local businessman in a march along Bethelview and Castleberry Road in south Forsyth County into the City of Cumming where they were assaulted by whites. The marchers retreated and vowed to return. During the following "Brotherhood March" on January 24, 1987, another racially mixed group returned to Forsyth County to complete the march the previous group had been unable to finish. March organizers estimated the number at 20,000, while police estimates ran from 12,000 to 14,000. Hosea Williams and former senator Gary Hart were in the demonstration. A group of the National Guard kept the opposition of about 1,000 in check. Oprah Winfrey featured Cumming and Forsyth County on her The Oprah Winfrey Show. She formed a town hall meeting where one audience member said:

However, most of the audience members agreed that Forsyth County should integrate. Rev. Hosea Williams was excluded from Oprah's show and arrested for trespassing.

City growth 
Today, the city is experiencing new growth and bears little resemblance to the small rural town it was mere decades ago. The completion of Georgia 400 has helped turn Cumming into a commuter town for metropolitan Atlanta. The city holds the Cumming Country Fair & Festival every October. The Sawnee Mountain Preserve provides views of the city from the top of Sawnee Mountain. In 1956, Buford Dam, along the Chattahoochee River, started operating. The reservoir that it created is called Lake Lanier. The lake, a popular spot for boaters, has generated income from tourists for Cumming as well as provides a source of drinking water. However, because of rapid growth of the Atlanta area, drought, and mishandling of a stream gauge, Lake Lanier has seen record-low water levels. Moreover, the lake is involved in a longstanding lawsuit between Georgia, Alabama, and Florida. Because of a recent ruling, the city of Cumming may not be able to draw water from the lake. However, the city is looking into different sources of water such as wells and various creeks.

Geography
Cumming is located in the center of Forsyth County at  (34.208464, -84.137575).

Government
Cumming is a municipal corporation; since 1845 it has been governed by a mayor and a five-member city council. The mayor and council members serve staggered four-year terms.

On December 22, 1834, Cumming was officially incorporated and five councilmen were appointed: John Jolly, William Martin, Daniel McCoy, John H. Russell, and Daniel Smith. The town of Cumming's charter was revised on December 22, 1845, resulting in new councilmen William F. Foster, Arthur Irwin, Major J. Lewis, Henry L. Sims, and Noah Strong.

House Bill 334 was enacted on October 10, 1885, giving Cumming a mayor and five-person city council.

Former mayor H. Ford Gravitt was first elected to the city council in 1966, and went on to be elected mayor in 1970. Gravitt was mayor of Cumming for 48 years before losing to rival candidate and current mayor Troy Brumbalow, who has held the office since January 2018.

City Council

Previous city council members
 Rupert Sexton, 1970–2015 (Post 1; mayor pro tem)
 John D. Pugh, 1993–2016 (Post 5)
 Quincy Holton, 1969–2017 (Post 2)
 Dot Otwell, 1956–1957
 Charles Welch, 1972–1986
 Chuck Welch, 2015–2017 (Post 1)
 Ralph Perry, 1979–2016 (Post 4)
 Kenneth J. Vanderhoff, 1987–1990

Previous mayors
Many historical records have been destroyed in fires, leaving some information unavailable or unverifiable.

 W. W. Pirkle (possible)
 T. J. Pirkle (possible)
 E. F. Smith (possible)
 Charles Leon Harris, term dates unknown (also Forsyth County School Superintendent, 1912–1916)
 Alman Gwinn Hockenhull, term dates unknown (also Cumming Postmaster, 1913–1922)
 Enoch Wesley Mashburn, 1913–?
 Marcus Mashburn Sr., 1917; 1961–1966
 Joseph Gaither Puett, 1918–1919
 Henry Lowndes "Snacks" Patterson, 1920–1921 (also Georgia General Assembly representative, 1884–1885; Commissioner of Public Instruction, 1892–1910; Blue Ridge Circuit Court judge, 1912–1917)
 John Dickerson Black, 1922–1923 (also Georgia General Assembly representative, 1933–1936)
 Andrew Benjamin "Ben" Tollison, 1926–1927 (also Forsyth County School Superintendent, 1920–1932)
 Roy Pilgrim Otwell, 1928–1956; 1959–1960
 Marcus Mashburn Jr., 1957–1958
 George Ingram, 1966–1970
 H. Ford Gravitt, 1970–2018

Transportation

Major highways

  U.S. Route 19
  State Route 9
  State Route 20
  State Route 306
  State Route 400

Pedestrians and cycling
Big Creek Greenway

Demographics

2020 census

As of the 2020 United States census, there were 7,318 people, 2,480 households, and 1,368 families residing in the city.

2010 census
As of the census of 2010, there were 5,430 people, 1,893 households (of which 57.1% were families), and 1,081 families residing in the city. The racial makeup of the city was 76.6% White, 31.4% Hispanic or Latino of any race, 16.9% from other races, 2.9% Black, 1.7% from two or more races, 1.4% Asian and 0.5% Native American.

The median income for a household in the city was $37,118, and the median income for a family was $48,947. Full-time, year-round male workers had a median income of $35,402 versus $31,892 for similarly situated females. The per capita income for the city was $18,326.  About 27.9% of families and 22.0% of the adult population were below the poverty line.

Education 
Cumming is served by Forsyth County Schools. The following schools are located in the county school district:

Elementary schools
 Big Creek Elementary
 Brandywine Elementary
 Brookwood Elementary
 Chattahoochee Elementary
 Chestatee Elementary
 Coal Mountain Elementary
 Cumming Elementary
 Daves Creek Elementary
 Haw Creek Elementary
 Johns Creek Elementary
 Kelly Mill Elementary
 Mashburn Elementary
 Matt Elementary
 Midway Elementary
 Poole's Mill Elementary
 Sawnee Elementary
 Settles Bridge Elementary
 Sharon Elementary
 Shiloh Point Elementary
 Silver City Elementary
 Vickery Creek Elementary
 Whitlow Elementary

Middle schools

Veritas Classical Schools
 DeSana Middle
 Hendricks Middle
 Lakeside Middle
 Liberty Middle
 Little Mill Middle
 North Forsyth Middle
 Otwell Middle
 Piney Grove Middle
 Riverwatch Middle
 South Forsyth Middle
 Vickery Creek Middle

High schools
 Alliance Academy for Innovation
 Denmark High School
 East Forsyth High School
 Forsyth Central High School
 Lambert High School
 North Forsyth High School
 Pinecrest Academy
 South Forsyth High School
 West Forsyth High School

Alternative schools
Creative Montessori School
Forsyth Academy
Forsyth Virtual Academy
Gateway Academy
 Montessori Academy at Sharon Springs
Mountain Education

Notable people

 Luke Appling, Hall of Fame Major League Baseball player
 Zac Brown, lead singer of the Grammy Award-winning Zac Brown Band, was born in Cumming
 Col. William Cumming, distinguished officer in the War of 1812, probable eponym of the town of Cumming (incorporated 1834)
 Skyler Day, actress born in Cumming
 Geoff Duncan, businessman and Lieutenant Governor of Georgia since 2019
 Kelli Giddish, actress born and raised in Cumming
 Colby Gossett, NFL player born and raised in Cumming
 Wynn Everett, actress raised in Cumming.
 Ethan Hankins, Cleveland Guardians baseball player
 Billy Magnussen, Tony Award nominated actor
 Ron Reis, former World Championship Wrestling wrestler also known as The Yeti, lives in Cumming
 Junior Samples, comedian on the TV show Hee Haw
 Glenn Sutko, former catcher for the Cincinnati Reds
 Roger L. Worsley, college administrator, formerly resided in Cumming

In popular culture
 American Reunion was partially filmed in Cumming at Mary Alice Park.
 Peach State Cats, Arena Football team in Cumming, Georgia
Unsolved Mysteries, Season 1 Episode 2 takes place in Cumming, Georgia.

References

External links

 City of Cumming official website
 Forsyth County, Georgia; Cumming is the county seat
 Video of Annual Steam Engine Parade 60 Minute DVD of parade with many antique steam engines.
 Cumming Steam, Antique Tractor and Gas Engine Exposition
 Forsyth Herald
 Cumming Historic Cemetery historical marker

Cities in Georgia (U.S. state)
Cities in Forsyth County, Georgia
Cities in the Atlanta metropolitan area
County seats in Georgia (U.S. state)
Sundown towns in Georgia (U.S. state)